Kerckhoff or Kerckhoffs is a Dutch and Low German toponymic surname meaning "church yard" (modern Dutch kerkhof). An ancestor may have lived near or worked in the church yard, or have come from a number of villages and hamlets named Kerkhove or Kerkhoven. Variant forms of the surname are Kerkhof, Kerkhoff(s), Kerkhove(n), and Van (de) Kerkhof(f). Notable people with the surname include:

Auguste Kerckhoffs (1835–1903), Dutch linguist and cryptographer
Kerckhoffs' principle, a cryptographic principle named for him
Hermann Kerckhoff (born 1937), German-born Canadian slalom canoeist
Joseph Kerckhoffs (1789–1867), Dutch physician
Steven Kerckhoff (born 1952), American mathematician
Sylvia Kerckhoff (born 1928), American mayor of Durham, North Carolina
William G. Kerckhoff (1856–1929), American businessman
Kerckhoff Dam, a reservoir dam in California named after him
Kerckhoff Marine Lab, southern California marine station owned and operated by Caltech named after him

See also
Kirchhoff, German cognate surname

References

Dutch-language surnames
Low German surnames
Toponymic surnames